India Navigation was an American record company and independent record label that specialized in avant-garde jazz in the 1970s and 1980s. It was founded by Bob Cummins, a corporate lawyer who helped jazz musicians with legal matters. Its catalogue included Arthur Blythe, Hamiet Bluiett, Chico Freeman, Cecil McBee, and the Revolutionary Ensemble. In addition to this, some recordings of minimal music, such as Arnold Dreyblatt, Phill Niblock and Joseph Celli, or Tom Johnson, also appeared.

Discography

References 

India Navigation
Jazz record labels
American independent record labels